Faces is the third studio album by Northern Irish musician, songwriter and record producer David Lyttle. It features collaborations with Talib Kweli, Duke Special and Joe Lovano.

Track listing 
All songs produced by David Lyttle.

References 

David Lyttle albums
2015 albums